The Senator Paul Simon Water for the World Act of 2009, also known as the Water for the World Act, is the name of two identical bills introduced in each house of the United States Congress. S. 624 has been cosponsored by 33 Senators. HR. 2030 has been cosponsored by 99 Representatives.

The purpose of this bill is to provide 100,000,000 people with first-time access to safe drinking water and sanitation on a sustainable basis by 2015 by improving the capacity of the United States Government to fully implement the Senator Paul Simon Water for the Poor Act of 2005.

This bill has been endorsed by numerous humanitarian organizations including the ONE Campaign, CARE, and Mercy Corps.

Provisions

Should this bill become law, it would require the Administrator of the United States Agency for International Development (USAID) to establish an Office of Water within the Bureau for Economic Growth, Agriculture, and Trade.  It would also establish the position of Special Coordinator for International Waters; this person would report to the Under Secretary for Democracy and Global Affairs.

The Office of Water would be responsible for implementing legislation specific to water, such as the Water for the Poor Act of 2005.  It would also develop and implement country-specific strategies.  Its primary emphasis would be on providing safe, affordable, and sustainable drinking water, sanitation, and hygiene.  This would be done in a manner that is consistent with sound water resource management principles and utilizes such approaches as direct service provision, capacity building, institutional strengthening, regulatory reform, and partnership collaboration.

See also 
 Poverty
 International Aid
 International Development
 Millennium Development Goals

References

External links
 Water for the World Act Summary

Proposed legislation of the 111th United States Congress
Acts of the 109th United States Congress